Dykeman's Spring, also known as Ainsworth Fish Farm and Asper Tract, is a historic fish farm located at Shippensburg in Cumberland County, Pennsylvania. The property has two contributing buildings, three contributing sites, and one contributing structure.  They are the Dykeman manor house (1871), hatch house (1871), the engineered structure of two connected ponds, and Dykeman's spring and two archaeological sites.  The Dykeman manor house was originally built about 1855, and remodeled and enlarged in the Italian Villa style in 1871. It is a 2 1/2-story, brick dwelling, 5-bays wide and 4-bays deep, on a limestone foundation.  It features a hipped roof topped by six foot square cupola.  The hatch house is a two-story limestone building measuring 31 feet wide by 36 feet deep.  The trout hatchery opened in 1871.

It was listed on the National Register of Historic Places in 1999.

Dykeman Park is a 50-acre municipal park that includes Dykeman's Spring.  The park includes the buildings, pond, a wetlands nature trail, picnic facilities, walking trails, and a baseball/softball field.

References

External links
 Dykeman Park - Shippensberg Borough Parks & Recreation

Farms on the National Register of Historic Places in Pennsylvania
Italianate architecture in Pennsylvania
Houses completed in 1871
Buildings and structures in Cumberland County, Pennsylvania
National Register of Historic Places in Cumberland County, Pennsylvania